Sweden was represented by Afro-dite in the Eurovision Song Contest 2002 with the song "Never Let It Go".

Before Eurovision

Melodifestivalen 2002 

Sweden's pre-selection for Eurovision Song Contest 2002, Melodifestivalen 2002 was held on 1 March 2002. For the first time in the history of the competition, four heats were held around the country in various arenas around Sweden. A "second chance" round was also held. In total, 32 songs competed this year, compared to 10 the previous years. For the first time, songs could be sung in a language other than Swedish. Hosted by Kristin Kaspersen and Claes Åkeson, the final was won by Afro-dite after the disco group won both the televoting and jury voting. The song they performed was written by Marcos Ubeda and called "Never Let It Go".

Heats and Winner's Choice round 

 The first heat took place on 19 January 2002. "Kom och ta mig" performed by Brandsta City Släckers and "Adrenaline" performed by Méndez qualified directly to the final, while "Världen utanför" performed by Barbados and "Last to Know" performed by Excellence advanced to the Winner's Choice round. "Blue as Her Angel Eyes" performed by Tom Nordahl, "Du har rört vid min själ" performed by Camilla Lindén, "Hollyowood-Do" performed by Zoë and "En värld som alltid brinner" performed by Richard Sköld were eliminated from the contest.
 The second heat took place on 26 January 2002. "Never Let It Go" performed by Afro-dite and "No hay nada más" performed by Javiera qualified directly to the final, while "What Difference Does It Make?" performed by the Poets and "Sail Away" performed by Annika Ljungberg advanced to the Winner's Choice round. "Ingenting ingenting" performed by Jennifer Newberry, "Du och jag (i hela världen)" performed by Martin, "Sluta!" performed by Ann-Louise and Molle and "Ge mig mitt hjärta tillbaka" performed by Jakob Stadell and Voice Boys were eliminated from the contest.
 The third heat took place on 2 February 2002. "Hon kommer med solsken" performed by Östen med Resten and "Big Time Party" performed by Hanna and Lina qualified directly to the final, while "Tidig är tiden" performed by Rolf Carlsson and "Det innersta rummet" performed by Date advanced to the Winner's Choice round. "Back Again" performed by Towe Jaarnek, "You're the Best Thing" performed by Linda Grip, "Ingenting är större än vi" performed by Arvingarna and "Hon är en annan nu" performed by Sylvia Vrethammar were eliminated from the contest.
 The fourth heat took place on 8 February 2002. "Vem é dé du vill ha" performed by Kikki, Bettan and Lotta and "The One That You Need" performed by Friends qualified directly to the final, while "Sista andetaget" performed by Jan Johansen and "Son of a Liar" performed by Kina Jaarnek advanced to the Winner's Choice round. "Ge mig himlen för en dag" performed by Solo, "I Want You" performed by Niklas Andersson, "It Takes 2" performed by the Honeydrops and "Vackrare nu" performed by Fredrik Wännman were eliminated from the contest.
 The Winner's Choice round (Vinnarnas val) took place on 22 February 2002. "Världen utanför" performed by Barbados and "Sista andetaget" performed by Jan Johansen qualified to the final.

Final 
The final took place on 1 March 2002 at the Globe Arena in Stockholm.

At Eurovision
At the contest Afro-dite were drawn to sing in 12th position, just before the interval. They eventually finished in 8th position (out of 24) with 72 points, receiving a maximum 12 points from Bosnia-Herzegovina.

The representative for the host country, Estonia, Sahlene, was Swedish. She finished 3rd, and got 12 points from Sweden.

Voting

References

2002
Countries in the Eurovision Song Contest 2002
Eurovision
Eurovision